Horrible Science is a TV series based on the Scholastic book series of the same name and stylistically fashioned after the Horrible Histories children's sketch show, both of which are part of the Horrible Histories franchise.

In 2015, CITV ordered a 10-part series of the children's sketch show Horrible Science starring actor Ben Miller, who had previously completed a PhD in solid state physics at Cambridge University. The commission went ahead due to the success of the contemporary CBBC series Horrible Histories, which was due to return for its sixth season. (The book series Horrible Histories had originally inspired the book series Horrible Science). Miller had recently guest starred in a Horrible Histories episode marking 800 years of Magna Carta as King John. Horrible Science was co-funded by ITV, The Wellcome Trust, ABC Australia, and Discovery Asia, and was produced by Miller's production company, Toff Media. Filming took place in Wimbledon, South West London.

The cast included Chris Martin, Letty Butler, Tom Bell, Eleanor Lawrence, Jason Forbes and Susan Wokoma. On the tone, the show's producers commented, "Horrible Science delights in the messy, gory and macabre, but as well as wallowing in all things yucky, it is full of fascinating science. Miller explained, "with this series, we really wanted it to be funny first and scientific second. We wanted to connect with children who had been put off science.” While the show was aimed at children, it was designed to be amusing to adults as well. Each episode had a central theme, for example Gruesome Guts and Chemical Chaos, which was expounded through comedy sketches, science experiments, and songs. Each episode also featured a guest actor portraying a historical scientist being interviewed.

References 

British children's television series